The Sheffield & Hallamshire Association Cup is a county cup competition involving teams within the Sheffield & Hallamshire County Football Association (S&HCFA).

Inaugurated in 2003, it is generally open to S&HCFA teams at levels 12-14 of the English football league system, although reserves teams at level 11 also compete. It is the second most important S&HCFA county cup, behind the Senior Cup.

2021-22 Participants 
Strikethrough denotes club that withdrew before playing a game.

Finals

Winners
Bold indicates club is still (2022) active.

 2 wins - Kiveton Park, Stocksbridge Park Steels reserves, Penistone Church reserves
 1 win - Elm Tree, HSBC, Athersley Recreation, Hall Green United, Sheffield reserves, Shaw Lane Aquaforce, Swinton Athletic, Jubilee Sports, Denaby Main, Handsworth Parramore reserves, Dodworth Miners Welfare, South Elmsall United Services

See also
 Sheffield & Hallamshire Senior Cup
 Sheffield & Hallamshire Junior Cup
 Sheffield & Hallamshire County Senior League

References

External links 
Official Site

Sport in Sheffield
Football in South Yorkshire
County Cup competitions